PyMC (formerly known as PyMC3) is a Python package for Bayesian statistical modeling and probabilistic machine learning which focuses on advanced Markov chain Monte Carlo and variational fitting algorithms.
It is a rewrite from scratch of the previous version of the PyMC software.
Unlike PyMC2, which had used Fortran extensions for performing computations, PyMC relies on PyTensor, a Python library that allows defining, optimizing, and efficiently evaluating mathematical expressions involving multi-dimensional arrays.
From version 3.8 PyMC relies on ArviZ to handle plotting, diagnostics, and statistical checks. PyMC and Stan are the two most popular probabilistic programming tools.
PyMC is an open source project, developed by the community and fiscally sponsored by NumFOCUS.

PyMC has been used to solve inference problems in several scientific domains, including
astronomy, 
epidemiology,
molecular biology,
crystallography,
chemistry,
ecology
and psychology.
Previous versions of PyMC were also used widely, for example in
climate science,
public health, neuroscience,
and parasitology.

After Theano announced plans to discontinue development in 2017, the PyMC team evaluated TensorFlow Probability as a computational backend, but decided in 2020 to take over the development of Theano.
Large parts of the Theano codebase have been refactored and compilation through JAX and Numba were added.
The PyMC team has released the revised computational backend under the name PyTensor and continues the development of PyMC.

Inference engines 
PyMC implements non-gradient-based and gradient-based Markov chain Monte Carlo (MCMC) algorithms for Bayesian inference and stochastic, gradient-based variational Bayesian methods for approximate Bayesian inference.
 MCMC-based algorithms:
 No-U-Turn sampler (NUTS), a variant of Hamiltonian Monte Carlo and PyMC's default engine for continuous variables
 Metropolis–Hastings, PyMC's default engine for discrete variables
 Sequential Monte Carlo for static posteriors
 Sequential Monte Carlo for approximate Bayesian computation  
 Variational inference algorithms:
 Black-box Variational Inference

See also 
 Stan is a probabilistic programming language for statistical inference written in C++
 ArviZ a Python library for Exploratory Analysis of Bayesian Models

References

Further reading 
 Probabilistic Programming and Bayesian Methods for Hackers
 Computational Statistics in Python

External links 
 PyMC website
 PyMC source, a Git repository hosted on GitHub
 Symbolic PyMC is an experimental set of tools that facilitate sophisticated symbolic manipulation of PyMC models

Computational statistics
Free Bayesian statistics software
Monte Carlo software
Numerical programming languages
Probabilistic software
Python (programming language) scientific libraries